The 1969–70 Boston Celtics season was the 24th season for the franchise of in the National Basketball Association (NBA). This was the first time the Celtics had missed the playoffs since the 1949–50 season, ending a 19-year playoff streak. This was also the first season without Hall of Famer Bill Russell, who retired following the 1968–69 season after winning his 11th championship.

This was the first team and last until 1998–99 Chicago Bulls to miss the playoffs after winning a championship the previous year.

Offseason

NBA Draft

Roster

Regular season

x = clinched playoff spot

Record vs. opponents

Game log

Player statistics

Awards and records
John Havlicek, All-NBA Second Team
John Havlicek, NBA All-Defensive Second Team
Jo Jo White, NBA All-Rookie Team 1st Team

References

Boston Celtics seasons
Boston Celtics
Boston Celtics
Boston Celtics
1960s in Boston
Celtics